Glipa atriventris is a species of beetle in the genus Glipa. It was described in 1923.

References

atriventris
Beetles described in 1923